Philadelphus Presbyterian Church, is a historic Presbyterian church located near Philadelphus, Robeson County, North Carolina.  It was built during the Antebellum era, in 1858, by carpenter Gilbert P. Higley. This church replaced an earlier one which had been in existence since at least 1795. The new church by Higley was constructed in the Greek Revival style with an in antis portico (columns on either side of the entranceway) and was able to accommodate a two-story sanctuary and gallery.

The property was listed on the National Register of Historic Places in 1975.

References

Churches on the National Register of Historic Places in North Carolina
Churches completed in 1858
19th-century Presbyterian church buildings in the United States
Churches in Robeson County, North Carolina
Presbyterian churches in North Carolina
Greek Revival church buildings in North Carolina
National Register of Historic Places in Robeson County, North Carolina